If You Are the One 2 (Chinese: 非诚勿扰2) is a 2010 Chinese film directed by Feng Xiaogang. It is the sequel to the 2008 film If You Are the One.

Plot

Qin (Ge You) and Liang (Shu Qi) question their relationship after watching their friends' lavish divorce ceremony.

Cast
Ge You
Shu Qi
Yao Chen 
Sun Honglei
Ady An 
Liao Fan 
Zhao Bing 
Feng Shaofeng
Guan Xiaotong
Zhang Hanyu
Zhao Baogang
Wu Yicong

References

External links 

Films directed by Feng Xiaogang
Films with screenplays by Wang Shuo
Huayi Brothers films
Chinese romantic comedy films